Rhododendron subgenus Azaleastrum is a subgenus of the genus Rhododendron.

The subgenus included two sections, however in 2005, Choniastrum was elevated to subgenus rank, but sections Sciadorhodion and Tsutsusi were added, providing a new total of three sections.
 Azaleastrum sect. Azaleastrum (4 species)
 Azaleastrum sect. Sciadorhodion 
 Azaleastrum sect. Tsutsusi (81 species)

References

Bibliography 
 Wilson EH, Rehder A. A MONOGRAPH OF AZALEAS RHODODENDRON SUBGENUS ANTHODENDRON. THE UNIVERSITY PRESS, CAMBRIDGE April 15 1921. PUBLICATIONS OF THE ARNOLD ARBORETUM, No. 9 
 

Azaleastrum
Plant subgenera